Gola Dzierżoniowska , abbreviated to Gola, is a village in the administrative district of Gmina Niemcza, within Dzierżoniów County, Lower Silesian Voivodeship, in south-western Poland.

The village has a population of 150.

Gola Castle is situated in the village.

References

Villages in Dzierżoniów County